Pascal Caron (born 1 April 1972) is a Canadian bobsledder. He competed at the 1994 Winter Olympics and the 2002 Winter Olympics.

References

1972 births
Living people
Canadian male bobsledders
Olympic bobsledders of Canada
Bobsledders at the 1994 Winter Olympics
Bobsledders at the 2002 Winter Olympics
Sportspeople from Trois-Rivières